Marek Daniel (born 13 September 1971) is a Czech actor. He appeared in more than 20 films since 1996 and had lead roles in Protector and Prezident Blaník.

Selected filmography

References

External links
 

1971 births
Living people
Czech male actors
Male actors from Prague
Czech male film actors
Czech male television actors
Janáček Academy of Music and Performing Arts alumni
Czech male stage actors
21st-century Czech male actors